Mariga is the surname of:
Daniel Mariga (1976–2006), Zimbabwean sculptor
Joram Mariga (1927–2000), Zimbabwean sculptor
McDonald Mariga (born 1987), Kenyan soccer player
Erick Mariga (1989), African Development Bank Group and:
Mariga, Nigeria, a Local Government Area in Niger State